Nipson anomēmata mē monan opsin, meaning "Wash the sins, not only the face", or "Wash my transgressions, not only my face", is a Greek palindrome that was inscribed upon a holy water font outside the Hagia Sophia in Constantinople:

Origin
The phrase is attributed to the fourth-century Saint Gregory of Nazianzus.

When the sentence is rendered in capital letters, as would be usual for an inscription (ΝΙΨΟΝΑΝΟΜΗΜΑΤΑΜΗΜΟΝΑΝΟΨΙΝ), all the letters are vertically symmetrical except for the Ν. As a result, if the N is stylized Ͷ in the right half (ΝΙΨΟΝΑΝΟΜΗΜΑΤΑΜΗΜΟͶΑͶΟΨΙͶ). The sentence is not only a palindrome but also a mirror ambigram.

Examples

The inscription can also be found in the following places:
 above the Hagiasma ("Holy Spring") of the Church of St. Mary of Blachernae in Istanbul;
 around the baptismal font at St. Michael's Cathedral in Barbados;
 at a fountain inside the church Panagia Ekatontapiliani in Parikia on the island Paros, Greece
 the font of several churches in Paris, including: St. Stephen d’Egres, Saint-Vincent-de-Paul, Paris, and Basilica of Notre-Dame-des-Victoires, Paris;
 in several churches in Britain, including: St. Mary's Church, Nottingham, Tewkesbury Abbey (Gloucestershire), Worlingworth (Suffolk), Harlow (Essex), Knapton (Norfolk), St Martin, Ludgate (London), St Ethelburga's Bishopsgate (London), and Hadleigh (Suffolk);

See also
List of Greek phrases
Sator square

References

Footnotes

Citations

Byzantine Greek inscriptions
Medieval Christian inscriptions
Palindromes